Angles is a commune in the Vendée department in the Pays de la Loire region in western France.

Geography
The river Lay forms all of the commune's eastern border. Angles is located to the south of the department between plains and marshes, 7 kilometres from the beaches of La Tranche sur Mer and Longeville sur Mer. The town is noted for its old alleys and its Romanesque and Gothic church.

Climate

Angles has a oceanic climate (Köppen climate classification Cfb).

History
Georges Clemenceau, a resident of the nearby Saint-Vincent-sur-Jard, described Angles at the beginning of the century as "a small town located at the extreme edge of the grove at the exact point where the sea retreats from the vast plain of Vendeen green marsh and where livestock is the country's industry. The agricultural vocation has long been the economic engine of an entire region, but since the early writings of the Tigris, much has changed ...

In the early eleventh century the area was subject to numerous Norman invasions, a concern that led to a  significant depopulation during this period. However,  the Tower of Moricq was constructed by local lords such as the Prince of Talmont in 1040 to safeguard the security of the area. They aimed to attract people to the area, especially the barons by providing real estate and financial resources to the development of agricultural activity and a church. In this context the city had its foundation around 1075 with the establishment, on the ruins of an ancient Gallo-Roman church of Sancta Maria Anglis (St. Mary of the Angels) by William son of Herbert.

On March 8, 1999, the city had a population of 1582 inhabitants, and a density of 46 inhabitants per km ². Tourism is a contributor to what is otherwise an agricultural economy and in the summer months tourists stay in Angles in campsites and cottages in the area.

Personalities
 René-Antoine Ferchault de Réaumur
 Raoul Pacaud (1862–1932), Deputy of the Vendée (1914–1919, 1928–1932)
 Albert Deman (1927–1996)

See also
Communes of the Vendée department

References

External links

Official site

Communes of Vendée